Wong Fai (born January 6, 1970) is a Hong Kong sport shooter. Wong represented Hong Kong, China at the 2008 Summer Olympics in Beijing, where he competed in the men's 25 m rapid fire pistol. He finished only in eighteenth place by two points behind 47-year-old Australian sport shooter and two-time Olympian Bruce Quick, with a total score of 558 points (282 on the first stage, and 276 on the second).

References

External links
NBC 2008 Olympics profile

Hong Kong male sport shooters
Living people
Olympic shooters of Hong Kong
Shooters at the 2008 Summer Olympics
1970 births
Asian Games medalists in shooting
Shooters at the 1990 Asian Games
Shooters at the 2006 Asian Games
Shooters at the 2010 Asian Games
Medalists at the 1990 Asian Games
Asian Games gold medalists for China
Sport shooters from Henan